Osiński (feminine: Osińska; plural: Osińscy) is a Polish-language surname.  Russian-language variant: Osinsky.

The surname may refer to:
 Dan Osinski (1933–2013), American baseball player
 Jan Osiński (1975–2010), Polish Roman Catholic priest
 Jerzy Osiński (1906–1982), Polish aviator
 Jerzy Osiński (politician) (born 1936), Polish politician
 Ludwik Osiński (1775-1838), Polish writer and official
 Marek Osinski, American electrical engineer
 Maximilian Osinski, American actor
 Michael Osinski (born 1954), American computer programmer
 Michał Osiński (born 1978), Polish footballer
 Natalia Osińska, Polish novelist
 Samuel Osiński (died 1649), Polish-Lithuanian noble
 Winand Osiński (1913–2006), Polish long-distance runner

See also
 

Polish-language surnames